The Qishla of Mecca was a fortress in Mecca, in what is now Saudi Arabia. Built in the eighteenth century as a military castle of the Ottoman Army, the building was located in the Jarwal district on the western side of the city. In the early hours of 10 June 1916, the barracks was attacked by Sharifian forces and its soldiers besieged.

It was demolished by the Saudi government to build several modern hotels facing the Grand Mosque.

Etymology 
The word Qishla (modern Turkish: Kışla) is a Turkish word meaning barracks.

See also

Ajyad Fortress
Tarout Castle
Qal'at al-Qatif

References

Buildings and structures completed in the 18th century
Buildings and structures in Mecca
Forts in Saudi Arabia
Demolished buildings and structures in Saudi Arabia
Castles in Saudi Arabia